Dendrobium yeageri (Yeager's dendrobium) is a species of the family Orchidaceae endemic to the Philippines named in honor of Dr. Clark Harvey Yeager. It is a small to medium-sized, warm growing epiphyte with thin descendant, clumping pseudobulbs that rarely branch and carry many, unsubdivided, pointed fleshy leaves.

References

yeageri
Endemic orchids of the Philippines
Plants described in 1934